Three ships in the United States Navy have been named USS Jouett for James Edward Jouett.

 was a  launched in 1912, served in World War I, served in the United States Coast Guard from 1924 to 1930 and sold in 1934
 was a  launched in 1938, served in World War II and decommissioned in 1945
 was a  guided missile cruiser launched in 1964 and decommissioned in 1994

United States Navy ship names